Dagon University, located in North Dagon, Yangon, is one of the largest universities in Myanmar. The university, established in 1993, offers bachelor's and master's degrees in liberal arts and sciences to full-time, part-time and online students. Dagon University also offers a full-time four-year law degree program. The university's  campus in the outskirts of Yangon is one of the largest campuses in the country.

History

Dagon University was opened in 1993 in North Dagon in the northeastern corner of Yangon to serve students from eastern Yangon districts. The move was widely believed to be part of the Burmese military government's plan to disperse university students across many universities and colleges around the country. Students who would have attended Yangon University now have to attend Dagon University or East Yangon University in Thanlyin, southeast of Yangon.

The university and all other arts and science universities in the country were closed down from December 1996 to July 2000, following student demonstrations in Yangon.

Programs
Classified as an Arts and Science university in the Burmese university education system, Dagon University offers bachelor's and master's degree programs in common liberal arts and sciences disciplines. Its regular Bachelor of Arts (BA) and Bachelor of Science (BSc) take four years to complete and honors degree programs BA (Hons) and BSc (Hons) take five years. The law program also takes five years. The university also offers an online program.

Transport
A new  rail extension was completed in 2006. Trains travel along the  route from Yangon Central Railway Station to the university, via Togyaunggalay Station, 10 times a day from 5:25am to 5:35pm. About 4000 students use the rail service daily.

Administration

Current 
Rectors have included:

 Dr. Thar Htun Maung 
 Dr. Nunu Yi (Pro -Rector)
 Dr. Hteik Tin Han (Pro -Rector)
 Dr. Myo Min (Pro -Rector)

List of rectors (1993-present) 

 U Kaung Nyut  (1993- 1998)
 Dr. Maung Thin (1998- 2004)
 U Kyaw Myint Oo (2005- 2007)
 U Sun (2007- 2011)
 Dr. Hla Htay (2012- 2016)
 Dr. Aye Aye Tun (2011- 2017)
 Dr. Win Maung (2017- 2019)
 Dr. Thar Htun Maung (2021- Present)

International relations

MoU with Dagon University 

 BABSEACLE, Australia
Dharma Gate Buddhist College, Hungary
University of Calcutta, India
The School of Oriental and African Studies (SOAS), University of London, UK
Ritsumeikan Asia Pacific University, Japan
Ritsumeikan University, Japan
 College of Science and Engineering, Kanazawa University, Japan
 Pukyong National University, South Korea
Chonbuk National University, South Korea
Pusan National University, South Korea
 Seoul National University, South Korea
 Mahidol University, Thailand
Prince of Songkla University, Thailand
Chiang Mai University, Thailand
Payap University, Thailand
King Mongkut's University of Technology Thonburi, Thailand
Kamphaeng Phet Rajabhat University, Thailand
 Silliman University, Philippines 
Central Philippine University, Philippines

Gallery

References

1993 establishments in Myanmar
Arts and Science universities in Myanmar
Educational institutions established in 1993
Universities and colleges in Yangon